Fritz Gerdsmeier (born 28 April 1962) is a German former wrestler. He competed at the 1984 Summer Olympics and the 1988 Summer Olympics.

References

External links
 

1962 births
Living people
German male sport wrestlers
Olympic wrestlers of West Germany
Wrestlers at the 1984 Summer Olympics
Wrestlers at the 1988 Summer Olympics
People from Aschaffenburg
Sportspeople from Lower Franconia